Bekkestua is a station and tram stop that is served both by Oslo Metro on Kolsås Line and Oslo Tramway on Lilleaker Line situated at Bekkestua in Bærum, Norway. It is the terminus of the Lilleaker Line for tramway.

Located between Ringstabekk and Gjønnes, it was reopened on 15 August 2011 after being closed on 1 July 2006. Between 1 July 2003 and November 2004, Bekkestua was the end station on the Kolsås Line. For a while the station was only being served by the Oslo Tramway line 13, while the station was closed for an upgrade.

Since 2 December 2007, tram operations (on line 13) have returned on this line from Lilleaker to Bekkestua. Operations beyond Lilleaker use SL95 trams as there is no turnback loop at Bekkestua. The tram operations were discontinued in 2009, but reopened in January 2014 after technical difficulties delayed the opening by one month. Bekkestua bus terminal is only a minute's walk from the metro and tram platforms (1, 2, 3).

Bus transfers (bus terminal)
Bekkestua is a transportation hub with connections to bus lines:
140 (Skøyen via Østerås)
145 (Fornebu via Stabekk and Lysaker)
150 (Gullhaug - Oslo Bus Terminal)
220 (Sandvika via Haslum and Valler
230 (Sandvika - (Ila/Listuveien)
211 (Sandvika - via Haslum)
212 (Bekkestua Round Route) via Hosle
213 (Sandvika) via Høvik and Blommenholm
214 (Bekkestua Round Route) via Ekern and Jar
216 (Kleivveien) via Søråsen
N140 (Oslo Bus Terminal - via Hosle, Østerås and Lysaker)
FB3 (Oslo Airport via Røa and Økern)

Øygardveien, which is served by route 150E (Gullhaug-Nationaltheatret) is about a 10–15 minutes walk away.

References

External links

Oslo Metro stations in Bærum
Oslo Tramway stations in Bærum
Railway stations opened in 1924
1924 establishments in Norway
Bus stations in Norway